Nurpur is a village in Nakodar in Jalandhar district of Punjab State, India. The village is administrated by a Sarpanch, an elected representative of the village.

Demography 
, The village has a total number of 400 houses and the population of 1993 of which 998 are males while 995 are females. According to the report published by Census India in 2011, out of the total population of the village 846 people are from Schedule Caste and the village does not have any Schedule Tribe population so far.

See also
List of villages in India

References

External links 
 Tourism of Punjab
 Census of Punjab

Villages in Jalandhar district
Villages in Nakodar tehsil